Silent Predators is a 1999 American horror television film directed by Noel Nosseck and starring Harry Hamlin and Shannon Sturges.

Plot
After a truck carrying a rare species of tropical rattlesnake crashes, the snakes escape into the wild. Twenty years later the snakes have bred with native rattlesnakes to create a highly aggressive and lethal new species that begin to slowly overrun the southern California town of San Vicente. After the deaths of several residents of a housing development, local fire chief Vic Rondelli tries to convince the city government that the snakes are a serious threat despite opposition from Max Farrington, a land developer more interested in finishing his work than the people's safety.

Cast
 Harry Hamlin as Vic Rondelli
 Shannon Sturges as Mandy Stratford
 David Spielberg as Mayor Parker
 Patty McCormack as Vera Conrad
 Beau Billingslea as George Mitchell
 Phillip Troy Linger as Dr. Matthew Watkins
 Jack Scalia as Max Farrington
 Paul Tassone as Stranded Motorist
 Dominic Purcell as Truck Driver

Production
Silent Predators was based on a script John Carpenter wrote in the 1970s. The movie was mostly filmed on Queensland, Australia, and Los Angeles, California.

Reception
Silent Predators received generally unfavorable reviews from critics, who criticized almost every aspect of the movie. Michael Speier of Variety called the film "absurdly unrealistic and dramatically inept", stating: "'Predators' is visually unspectacular, and the scare tactics are buried beneath Michael Tavera's heavy-handed score and some poorly realized jump-cut editing from Tod Feuerman".

References

External links
 
 
 

1999 films
American natural horror films
Films scored by Michael Tavera
American horror television films
1990s English-language films
Films directed by Noel Nosseck
1990s American films